Iraqi Kurdistan independence referendum may refer to:
2005 Kurdistan Region independence referendum
2017 Kurdistan Region independence referendum